The 2013 Continental Tire Sports Car Challenge was the thirteenth season of the Grand American Road Racing Association's support series and the final under the Grand Am sanctioning body. For 2014 the series will change to being sanctioned by the International Motor Sports Association upon Grand Am's merger with IMSA's American Le Mans Series to form the United SportsCar Championship. The series, to be known as the IMSA Continental Tire Sports Car Challenge, will remain entirely unaffected aside from the new sanctioning body.

Schedule
The schedule was announced on September 29, 2012.

References

2013
Continental Tire Sports Car Challenge